Jacobsenia is a genus of flowering plants belonging to the family Aizoaceae.

It is native to the Cape Provinces in the South African Republic.

The genus name of Jacobsenia is in honour of Hermann Jacobsen (1898–1978), a German gardener and botanist. He was also curator and supervisor at a botanical garden in Kiel and specialist in succulents. It was first described and published Kakteen And. Sukk. Vol.5 on page 69 in 1954.

Species, according to Kew;
Jacobsenia hallii 
Jacobsenia kolbei

References

Aizoaceae
Aizoaceae genera
Plants described in 1954
Flora of the Cape Provinces
Taxa named by Martin Heinrich Gustav Schwantes
Taxa named by Louisa Bolus